"Call My Name" is a song recorded by German singer Pietro Lombardi. It was written and produced by Dieter Bohlen for his first studio album Jackpot (2011). The song served as Lombardi's coronation song after winning the eighth season of Deutschland sucht den Superstar (DSDS). It was released by Polydor Records as his debut single on May 7, 2011 in German-speaking Europe.

Influences
Klaus Friedler, a music academic at the University of Hamburg, commented that there were several similarities between the song and American pop band OneRepublic's "Marchin On."

Track listing 
CD single
 "Call My Name" (Single Version) – 3:42
 "Call My Name" (Club Mix) – 4:12

Charts

Weekly charts

Year-end charts

Certifications

Sarah Engels version 

A recording of the song by Sarah Engels was released on the same day as Pietro Lombardi's recording on 7 May 2011.

Track listing 
CD single
 "Call My Name" - 3:44
 "Call My Name" (Club Mix) - 4:13

Weekly charts

Year-end charts

References 

2011 singles
Pietro Lombardi (singer) songs
Sarah Lombardi songs
Songs written by Dieter Bohlen
Number-one singles in Germany
Number-one singles in Austria
Number-one singles in Switzerland
Song recordings produced by Dieter Bohlen
2011 songs